Roger Lee Sisson (June 24, 1926 – January 22, 1992) was an early data processing pioneer. Sisson worked on Project Whirlwind while a graduate student at MIT, co-founded the first consulting firm devoted to electronic data processing, and published a number of the earliest books and periodicals on computers and data processing.

Sisson earned his M.S. in electrical engineering from MIT in January 1950. He worked in Jay Forrester’s lab on Project Whirlwind. His thesis, written with Alfred Susskind, was on the digital to analog conversion for the cathode ray tube display.

Sisson, with Richard Canning, started one of the first consulting firms devoted exclusively to electronic data processing, Canning, Sisson, and Associates. Canning and Sisson also published one of the earliest computer periodicals, Data Processing Digest, starting in 1955.  Sisson went on to write a number of noted books on the subject of EDP, including The Management of Data Processing, and A Manager’s Guide to Data Processing. He wrote an early and influential paper in the field of Operations Research, "Methods of Sequencing in Job Shops" in the journal Operations Research in 1959.

Sisson died January 22, 1992, in New York City, of sudden cardiac arrest. He was 65 at the time of his death.

References

External links 
Book references for Roger Sisson
Grabbe Automation in Business and Industry Bitsavers references for Roger Sisson
Proceedings of a Second Symposium on Large-Scale Digital Calculating Machinery Bitsavers references for Roger Sisson

MIT School of Engineering alumni
American computer scientists
1926 births
1992 deaths